Kuzume Naoyuki (1890 – 1944) was a colonel in the Imperial Japanese Army.

Biography 

Kuzume Naoyuki was the commander of defenses on the island of Biak, near the Japanese-held bases in Papua New Guinea. He led the IJA 22nd Infantry Regiment, over 3,400 troops. He made a desperate defense of the island, covering it with pillboxes, bunkers, and spider holes. Nevertheless, the US troops were able to successfully fight their way to the east caves. On June 28, Naoyuki decided to commit seppuku, the ritual suicide, since the Japanese had little chance of victory. He was posthumously promoted as lieutenant general.

1944 deaths
Japanese military personnel killed in World War II
1890 births
Japanese generals
Imperial Japanese Army personnel of World War II